Jean-Loup Dabadie (27 September 1938 – 24 May 2020) was a French journalist, writer, lyricist, screenwriter and member of the Académie Française.

Filmography
 Anna (1967)
 Such a Gorgeous Kid Like Me (1972)
 Parisian Life (1977)
 Courage – Let's Run (1979)
 Clara et les Chics Types (1981)
 Get Well Soon (2014)

Awards
1985 Mystfest for Original Story –  La Septième Cible – directed by Claude Pinoteau

Nominated three times for a Cesar Award.

References

External links
  L'Académie française
 

1938 births
2020 deaths
Members of the Académie Française
French male screenwriters
Lycée Janson-de-Sailly alumni
Writers from Paris
Commandeurs of the Légion d'honneur
Officers of the Ordre national du Mérite
Commandeurs of the Ordre des Arts et des Lettres